Manolis Kragiopoulos (born 29 May 1998) is a Greek professional footballer who plays as an attacking midfielder for Super League 2 club Makedonikos.

References

1998 births
Living people
Greek footballers
Gamma Ethniki players
Football League (Greece) players
Super League Greece players
Super League Greece 2 players
Pierikos F.C. players
Apollon Smyrnis F.C. players
Platanias F.C. players
Iraklis Thessaloniki F.C. players
Association football midfielders
Footballers from Katerini